Kings Watch is a bi-monthly comic book limited series written by Jeff Parker and drawn by Marc Laming.  It was published by Dynamite Entertainment from September 6, 2013 to April 7, 2014. It is a crossover featuring Flash Gordon, the Phantom, and Mandrake the Magician from King Features Syndicate. The trade paperback edition was released on August 13, 2014.

Premise 
When strange phenomena fill the skies and all humanity shares a similar vision, Flash Gordon, the Phantom, and Mandrake the Magician join forces to face a threat that is related to the Cult of the Cobra.

Sequel 
A sequel titled Kings Quest was released from May to September 2016.

References 

Gold Key Comics
2013 comics debuts

Crossover comics
Flash Gordon

Dynamite Entertainment titles
2014 comics endings
The Phantom